Cimentul Fieni was a professional Romanian association football club from Fieni, Dâmbovița County, founded in 1936 and dissolved in 2005.

The club was dissolved in 2005 after a merger with a club from Buftea, the resulting club being named CS Buftea.

Cimentul never reached Liga I. They were close to gain promotion in 2002, when they played a play-off against Sportul Studențesc. Sportul Studențesc won both legs, 3–0 in Fieni and 2–1 in Bucharest, thus remaining in Divizia A.

Honours
Liga III
Winners (2): 1991–92, 1997–98
Runners-up (1): 1996–97

Liga IV – Dâmbovița County
Winners (2): 1972–73

References

External links
 Club's page at soccerway.com
 Club's page at futbol24.com

Association football clubs established in 1936
Association football clubs disestablished in 2005
Defunct football clubs in Romania
Football clubs in Dâmbovița County
Liga II clubs
1936 establishments in Romania
2005 disestablishments in Romania